Selma is a historic plantation house located at Eastville, Northampton County, Virginia. The original section of the manor house was built about 1785, and was a two-story, three-bay with a side-passage and single pile plan topped with a gambrel roof. The house was later modified and expanded and is in the form of a "big house, little house, colonnade, kitchen." Also on the property are the contributing attached kitchen, two cemeteries, a shed, the brick foundation floor of a former kitchen, and a boxwood garden.

It was listed on the National Register of Historic Places in 2006.

References

Plantation houses in Virginia
Houses on the National Register of Historic Places in Virginia
Greek Revival houses in Virginia
Houses completed in 1785
Houses in Northampton County, Virginia
National Register of Historic Places in Northampton County, Virginia
1785 establishments in Virginia